Courtenay Station is a former railway station in downtown Courtenay, British Columbia. The station was the northern terminus for the Dayliner Via Rail service that ended in 2011.

History 
Courtenay Station was built in 1914 when the Esquimalt and Nanaimo Railway reached Courtenay. It was originally supposed to be a stop along the line to Campbell River, however, due to World War I the line only went as far as Courtenay.

The former Canadian Pacific Railway station was given heritage status by the City of Courtenay in 2002.

Closure 
The station was closed indefinitely on March 19, 2011 due to track maintenance. However, due to a lack of funding the line was replaced with a bus service, and on August 7, 2011, the station closed. Service was supposed to start in summer 2015, but this was also cancelled due to lack of funding.

References 

Via Rail stations in British Columbia
Designated Heritage Railway Stations in British Columbia
Courtenay, British Columbia
Railway stations closed in 2011
2011 disestablishments in British Columbia
Disused railway stations in Canada